This is a list of Famous South Islanders:

A

Alexander Aitken - mathematician/statistician, writer, mental calculator, musician
Ronald Algie - politician
Fred Allen - rugby union player
James Allen - politician
James Allen - rugby union player
Rewi Alley - supporter of Chinese communism
Peter Arnett - TV journalist, Pulitzer Prize winner
Basil Arthur - politician
Ian Athfield - architect

B

David Bain
Alison Ballance - author and film-maker
Rick Barker - politician
James Baxter - poet
Francis Bell - first New Zealand-born Prime Minister
David Benson-Pope - politician
Todd Blackadder - rugby player
Ben Blair - rugby player
William Brassington - stonemason and sculptor
Kelly Brazier - rugby player
John Britten -  designer of the Britten motorcycle
Donald Forrester Brown - awarded the Victoria Cross
Nigel Brown - painter
Gerry Brownlee - politician
Kerry Burke - politician

C

Dan Carter - rugby player
 Nathan Cohen - world champion and Olympic champion rower
Thomas Cooke - awarded the Victoria Cross
Warren Cooper - politician
Michael Cullen - politician
G. H. Cunningham - plant pathologist
Allen Curnow - poet

D

Alan Dale - actor
Lianne Dalziel - politician
Stephnie de Ruyter - politician
Bob Deans - rugby union player
Bruce Deans - rugby union player
Robbie Deans - rugby player and coach
Rod Dixon - runner
Rod Donald - politician
Sarah Dougherty - early settler
Jimmy Duncan - rugby union player, coach and referee
Peter Dunne - politician

E

Andy Ellis - rugby union player
Thomas Ellison - rugby union player and lawyer
Bill English - politician

F

Bob Fitzsimmons - world boxing heavyweight champion
Corey Flynn - rugby player
George Forbes - Prime Minister
Tom Fyfe - mountaineer

G

George Gair - politician
Daryl Gibson - rugby player
Charles Gifford - teacher and very successful promoter of astronomy
George Gillett - rugby union player
Sir Harold Gillies - pioneering plastic surgeon
Robin Gray - politician
Arthur Guinness - politician
Stewart Graeme Guthrie - police sergeant posthumously awarded the George Cross

H

Sir Richard Hadlee - cricketer
John Hall - Premier of New Zealand
William Hall-Jones - Prime Minister of New Zealand
Adam Hamilton - politician
Bill Hamilton - developed the modern jetboat
Scott Hamilton - rugby union player
Mark Hammett - rugby union player
Dame Joan Hammond - violinist, soprano
Joseph Hatch - Invercargill businessman, "harvester" of penguins
Rudy Heeman - inventor
Louise Henderson - painter
Graham Henry - rugby union coach
Jack Hinton - awarded the Victoria Cross
Frances Hodgkins - painter
Sidney Holland - Prime Minister
Sir Fred Hollows - eye surgeon
Andrew Hore - rugby union player
Ned Hughes - rugby union player
Alfred Hulme - awarded the Victoria Cross
Denny Hulme - world champion racing driver

J

Chris Jack - rugby player
Rowena Jackson - ballerina

K

Phil Keoghan - TV presenter
Norman Kirk - Prime Minister
Terry Knights - awarded the Military Cross for service in Iraq

L

Robert Lawson - architect
Richard Loe - rugby player
Jack Lovelock - runner
Isaac Luck - architect
Len Lye - sculptor, experimental film maker

M

Laurie Mains - rugby union player and coach
Justin Marshall - rugby union player
Aaron Mauger - rugby union player
Ivan Mauger - six time Motorcycle speedway world champion
Nathan Mauger - rugby union player
Colin McCahon - painter, museum curator, teacher
Richie McCaw - rugby union player
Leon MacDonald - rugby union player
Thomas Mackenzie - Prime Minister of New Zealand
Shona McFarlane - painter
Michael McGarry - football player
Duncan McGregor - rugby union player
Sir Archie McIndoe - pioneer plastic surgeon
Cameron McIntyre - rugby player
Peter McIntyre - painter
Andrew Mehrtens - rugby union player
Henry Monson - gaoler
William Sefton Moorhouse - prominent Canterbury politician and settler
Benjamin Mountfort - architect
Burt Munro - speed record breaker
Colin Murdoch - inventor of the disposable syringe

N

Edgar Neale - Mayor (1941–1945) and MP (1946–1957) for Nelson
Henry James Nicholas - awarded the Victoria Cross
Tane Norton - former All Black captain

P

Geoffrey Palmer - Prime Minister of New Zealand
Richard Pearse - early aviator and inventor
Francis Petre - architect

R

Bill Rowling - Prime Minister of New Zealand
Bic Runga - singer, songwriter
Ernest Rutherford - 1st Baron Rutherford of Nelson, scientist and winner of the 1908 Nobel Prize in Chemistry

S

Richard Seddon - Prime Minister of New Zealand
George 'Johnny' Sellars - pioneering parachutist
Henry Sewell - Premier of New Zealand
Kate Sheppard - suffragist
Jenny Shipley - New Zealand's first female Prime Minister
Edward Stafford - Premier of New Zealand
Billy Stead - rugby union player
Robert Stout - Premier of New Zealand
Grahame Sydney - painter

T

Sir Angus Tait - businessman and electronics innovator
Brad Thorn - rugby union and rugby league player
Reuben Thorne - rugby union player
Richard Travis - awarded the Victoria Cross
Brian Turner - poet
Glenn Turner - cricketer
Greg Turner - golfer

U

Charles Upham - World War II soldier (one of three awarded the Victoria Cross twice)

V

Petrus Van der Velden - painter
Sir Julius Vogel - Premier of New Zealand

W

Miles Warren - architect
Robert Webster - discovered the link between human flu and bird flu
Ian Wedde - poet
Hayley Westenra - singer
Tony Wilding - tennis player
Geoff Williams - painter
Jeff Wilson - sportsman
Shelton Woolright - musician, best known as the drummer of Blindspott
Alex Wyllie - rugby union player and coach

South Islanders